This is a list of ecoregions in Bolivia.

Terrestrial
Bolivia is in the Neotropical realm. Ecoregions are listed by biome.

Tropical and subtropical moist broadleaf forests
 Madeira-Tapajós moist forests
 Bolivian Yungas
 Southern Andean Yungas
 Southwest Amazon moist forests

Tropical and subtropical dry broadleaf forests
 Bolivian montane dry forests
 Chaco
 Chiquitano dry forests

Tropical and subtropical grasslands, savannas, and shrublands
 Beni savanna
 Cerrado

Flooded grasslands and savannas
 Pantanal

Montane grasslands and shrublands
 Central Andean dry puna
 Central Andean puna
 Central Andean wet puna

References

 
ecoregions
Bolivia